Wong Chuk Yeung is a village in Fo Tan, Sha Tin District, Hong Kong.

Administration
Wong Chuk Yeung is a recognized village under the New Territories Small House Policy. It is one of the villages represented within the Sha Tin Rural Committee. For electoral purposes, Wong Chuk Yeung is part of the Sui Wo constituency, which was formerly represented by Ken Mak Tsz-kin until July 2021.

History
In the early 20th century, the villagers of Wong Chuk Yeung generated a large part of their income from selling fuel cut from the extensive woods which were to be found near the village. The woods at Wong Chuk Yeung, on the eastern slopes of Grassy Hill, held tigers every year during the breeding season.

See also
 Kau Yeuk (Sha Tin)

References

Further reading

External links

 Delineation of area of existing village Wong Chuk Yeung (Sha Tin) for election of resident representative (2019 to 2022)

Fo Tan
Villages in Sha Tin District, Hong Kong